Radio West Fife is one of Scotland's oldest hospital radio stations and broadcasts by landline to the Queen Margaret Hospital in Dunfermline.

From its humble beginnings in September 1953, when broadcasting from a shed in the grounds of the West Fife Hospital, the station has grown considerably. This has been achieved partly through the fundraising efforts of the members and partly through sponsorships.

In the early days, the station focused on live broadcasts from Dunfermline Athletic Football Club’s home games at East End Park, but now broadcasts a mix of music and specialist output including religious programmes.

Following a spell of broadcasting from a caravan at Milesmark Hospital, the station moved to the grounds of Lynebank Hospital in 1993.

Some pupils from nearby St Columbus High School volunteer at Radio West Fife as part of school community outreach programmes.

The station began broadcasting online as a community radio station on 23 March 2012.

In May 2020, Radio West Fife was awarded an FM license from Ofcom.

Current facilities 
Radio West Fife is currently based at Rosyth Business Centre, having moved from its studio at Queen Margaret Hospital in 2019 due to re-development of facilities at the hospital. The station began broadcasting from Rosyth in February 2020.

Radio West Fife broadcasts online on their website and on the mobile apps TuneIn and Local Radio Player.

References

External links
 Hospital Broadcasting Association
 Media UK: Radio West Fife
 Radio West Fife website

Hospital radio stations
Fife
Radio stations established in 1953
Radio stations in Scotland